Denis Rusu may refer to:

Denis Rusu (footballer, born 1990), Moldovan footballer
Denis Rusu (footballer, born 2001), Romanian footballer